Joel Courtney (born January 31, 1996) is an American actor known for his role in the 2011 film Super 8 and for his starring role in Netflix's The Kissing Booth film series.

Early life and education
Courtney was born in Monterey, California, on January 31, 1996, and was raised in Moscow, Idaho, where he attended Logos School, a Classical Christian school. While still living in Idaho, Courtney took a trip to Los Angeles during the first week of his summer school break in 2010, where he hoped to be in a commercial and make $100.

Career
Casting director Patti Kalles advised Courtney to audition for Paramount Pictures' Super 8 (2011). After 11 callbacks, Courtney landed the starring role of Joe Lamb in the film. At the 2012 Saturn Awards, Courtney won the award for Best Performance by a Younger Actor.

In August 2011, Courtney filmed Tom Sawyer & Huckleberry Finn (2014) in Bulgaria, playing the part of Tom Sawyer.

In 2012, Courtney filmed the supernatural thriller Don't Let Me Go (2016), playing a disgruntled teen who joins his father on a camping trip only to have a run-in with otherworldly forces. That same year, he appeared in the Fox TV movie Rogue.

In November 2012, Courtney was cast in the Stephen King film Mercy, which was released direct-to-video in 2014.

In 2013, Courtney was cast in the direct-to-video indie films Dear Eleanor (2016) and Sins of our Youth (2016).

Courtney appeared in the lead ensemble of the CW Television Network series The Messengers, which was cancelled during its single 2014–15 season.

In 2016, Courtney had a one-episode role in the third season of Agents of S.H.I.E.L.D. as Nathaniel Malick.

Courtney played the lead in the indie project The River Thief (2016), directed by N. D. Wilson. In 2015, Courtney joined the cast of the indie film Replicate and, in 2016, joined the cast of the indie film F the Prom. In 2018, he starred in the Netflix film The Kissing Booth, a role he reprised in the film's 2020 sequel The Kissing Booth 2. Courtney also reprised his Kissing Booth role in the series' third film, The Kissing Booth 3, released in 2021.

In 2020, Courtney was cast in Lionsgate's Jesus Revolution, released in 2023.

Personal life 
On February 14, 2020, he proposed to his longtime girlfriend, Mia Scholink. He married Scholink on September 27, 2020.

Courtney's favorite book series are 100 Cupboards and Ashtown Burials, both by N. D. Wilson, who directed the 2016 film The River Thief, which Courtney starred in.

Filmography

Film

Television

Awards and nominations

References

External links

 
 
 

1996 births
21st-century American male actors
American Christians
American male child actors
American male film actors
American male television actors
Living people
Male actors from California
Male actors from Idaho
People from Monterey, California
People from Moscow, Idaho